Leinster Lightning is one of three provincial cricket teams in Ireland. Along with the North West Warriors and Northern Knights it makes up the Inter-Provincial Championship, Interprovincial One-Day Trophy and Interprovincial Twenty20 Cup.

The team is located in Leinster province of Ireland and is managed by Cricket Leinster.

History

In 2013, Cricket Ireland formed the three-day Interprovincial Championship, featuring teams from Leinster, the NCU and the North West. The Leinster team is known as Leinster Lightning.

In February 2015, they announced Ted Williamson as their coach, taking over at the helm from Trent Johnston. Under his coaching, Leinster Lightning took a clean-sweep of trophies in the 2015 and 2016 seasons before he stepped down from the position.

Up to and including the 2016 Inter-Provincial Championship, the matches were not given first-class status. However, at an International Cricket Council meeting in October 2016, first-class status was awarded to all future matches.

Honours

Inter-Provincial Championship - (First Class) - 6 titles
 2013, 2014, 2015, 2016 and 2017 and 2019 : Champions

Inter-Provincial Cup - (50 over) - 8 titles
2014, 2015, 2016, 2017, 2018 , 2019, 2020 and 2021: Champions

Inter-Provincial Trophy - (T20) - 6 titles
 2013, 2015, 2016, 2017, 2018 and 2020 : Champions

Current squad
  denotes players with international caps.

Grounds

References

External links
Cricket Leinster
Leinster Lightning official website

 
Cricket in Leinster
Irish first-class cricket teams
2013 establishments in Ireland
Cricket clubs established in 2013